Okanagana canadensis, the Canadian cicada, is a species of cicada in the family Cicadidae. It is found in North America.

References

Further reading

 

Articles created by Qbugbot
Insects described in 1889
Okanagana